Connor Paolo (born July 11, 1990) is an American actor. He is known for his roles as Eric van der Woodsen on The CW's teen drama series Gossip Girl and Declan Porter on the ABC drama series Revenge. He has also appeared in two Oliver Stone films, Alexander (2004) and World Trade Center (2006).

Personal life
Paolo was born in New York City, the son of Julia Mendelsohn, a vocal coach and classical pianist, and Colin Paolo, a writer and screenwriter. Paolo is Jewish.

He attended, beginning in 2006, the Professional Performing Arts School alongside Sarah Hyland, Paul Iacono and Taylor Momsen. He took acting classes at the Lee Strasberg Theatre and Film Institute. Paolo also attended Appel Farm Arts and Music Center Summer Arts Camp located in Elmer, New Jersey for several summers. He attended New York University for one semester in fall 2008.

Career
He played a preteen murderer-rapist in an episode of Law & Order: Special Victims Unit. He made his motion picture debut in Clint Eastwood's Oscar-nominated Mystic River, playing young Sean. In 2004, Paolo was on One Life to Live as Travis O'Connell, a recurring character. Paolo also made a return appearance on Law & Order: Special Victims Unit, playing a disturbed teenager based on the real case of Justin Berry. Other films include World Trade Center for Oliver Stone in 2006; Snow Angels, directed by David Gordon Green; and Favorite Son, his first leading role.

Paolo has a background in theatre and commercials. He has appeared on the Broadway stage in the hit musical The Full Monty and off-Broadway in the New York public theater production of Shakespeare's Richard III. He played Bottom in an abridged production of Shakespeare's Midsummer Night's Dream.

From 2007 to 2011, Paolo had a supporting role on The CW's series Gossip Girl, where he played Eric van der Woodsen, the brother of lead Serena van der Woodsen's character. His last appearance was in the sixth season.

In 2010, he starred in the vampire apocalypse film Stake Land directed by Jim Mickle.

In April 2011, Paolo joined the cast of ABC's dramatic series Revenge. In August 2011, Paolo stated that he would be taking on the new series Revenge full-time and his character Eric van der Woodsen on Gossip Girl would no longer appear on the show. He, however, returned to Gossip Girl for a brief appearance during the series finale. Paolo exited Revenge in May 2013, after his character was written off the second season finale.

In 2020, Variety announced Paolo was joining the cast of the Chris Blake quarantine comedy Distancing Socially. The film was shot at the height of the COVID-19 pandemic in 2020, using remote technologies and the iPhone 11. The film was acquired and released by Cinedigm in October 2021.

Filmography

Film

Television

Video games

Music videos

References

External links
 

1990 births
21st-century American male actors
American male child actors
American male film actors
American male soap opera actors
American male television actors
American male video game actors
Living people
Male actors from New York City